Football Club Avenir Beggen is a football club, based in Beggen, a quarter of Luxembourg City, in southern Luxembourg.

The club were founded in 1915 as FC Daring Beggen but changed their name to FC Avenir Beggen a year later. In 1940, they were renamed SV 1915 Beggen, but in 1944, it was changed again to FC Avenir Beggen.

Avenir Beggen had played in the National Division in consecutive seasons since 1965–66, but were relegated in the 2005–06 season. Finishing second in their first season in the second-tier Division of Honour, Avenir returned to the National Division at the first time of asking. In 2008/09 the club finished 14th and were relegated back to the Luxembourg Division of Honour.

Honours
 National Division
Winners (6): 1968–69, 1981–82, 1983–84, 1985–86, 1992–93, 1993–94
Runners-up (5): 1974–75, 1982–83, 1986–87, 1989–90, 1991–92

 Luxembourg Cup
Winners (7): 1982–83, 1983–84, 1986–87, 1991–92, 1992–93, 1993–94, 2001–02
Runners-up (4): 1973–74, 1987–88, 1988–89, 1997–98

European Competition
Avenir have qualified for UEFA European competition sixteen times.

UEFA Champions League
Qualifying round (2): 1993–94, 1994–95
First round (4): 1969–70, 1982–83, 1984–85, 1986–87

UEFA Cup
Qualifying round (1): 2002–03
First round (4): 1975–76, 1985–86, 1990–91, 1995–96

UEFA Cup Winners' Cup
First round (4): 1983–84, 1987–88, 1988–89, 1992–93
Second round (1): 1974–75

They have won three ties in European competition (although two were only on technicalities):
In 1974–75, their Cup Winners' Cup first round opponents, Enosis Paralimni of Cyprus, withdrew due to ongoing crisis in that country.
In the same competition in 1992–93, Avenir beat the Faroe Islands' B36 Tórshavn 2–1 on aggregate in the qualifying round, before losing 5–1 on aggregate to Spartak Moscow in the first round proper.
In the 1995–96 UEFA Cup, Avenir lost on away goals to Örebro SK, but Avenir were awarded a 3–0 victory when it transpired that the Swedes had fielded an ineligible player.

Throughout its history the team has won three rounds in Europe, including Champions League, UEFA Cup and Cup Winners' Cup. In 1969, Avenir Beggen won their first league title in Luxembourg, with a historic victory followed by 10,000 spectators, of 3-1 against Jeunesse d'Esch. Moreover, thanks to this victory, the club qualified for the Champions League for the first time where they played against AC Milan (0-5 to Milan and 0-3 in Luxembourg city).

Another success for Avenir Beggen came on the 60th anniversary of the club, 1 September 1975, when Avenir Beggen played their first UEFA Cup tie (now Europa League) against FC Porto (0-7 in Porto and 0-3 in Luxembourg city).

In addition to those three ties, Avenir has won one game in a tie that they eventually lost (2–1 at home against Inter Bratislava in the 1990–91 UEFA Cup, before losing 5–0 in Bratislava).

Overall, Avenir's record in European competition reads:

Current squad
2008–09 season

Former coaches

 Marc Boreux (1966–72)
 Henri Cirelli (1973–76)
 Josy Kirchens (1976–77)
 Willi Macho (1979–80)
 Albert Adams (1980–82)
 Jean Bettinger (1982–83)
 Paul Philipp (1983–85)
 Michel Clement (1985–88)
 Louis Pilot (1988–90)
 Albert Adams (1990–95)
 Jacky Pérignon (1995–96)
 Theo Scholten (1996)
 Vinicio Monacelli (2000)
 Jeannot Reiter (2000–02)
 Gilbert Dresch (2002–03)
 Jean Fiedler (2003)
 Jacky Pérignon (2003)
 Michel Clement (2003–04)
 Florim Alijaj (2004–05)
 Fernando Gutiérrez (2004–05)
 Florim Alijaj (2005)
 Fernando Gutiérrez (2005–08)
 Manuel Peixoto (2008–09)
 Jos Steffen (2009–11)
 Dan Santos (2013–16)
 Gilles Wagner (2016)
 Paulo Gomes (2016–17)
 Carlo Feipel (2017)
 Jeannot Reiter (2017–18)
 Almir Civic (2018–)

References

External links

FC Avenir Beggen official website

Football clubs in Luxembourg City
Association football clubs established in 1915
1915 establishments in Luxembourg